John Klotz was a Belgian sailor who won the Silver medal in 6 metre class (1919 rating) in the 1920 Summer Olympics in Antwerp along with Léon Huybrechts and Charles van den Bussche.

References

Year of birth missing
Year of death missing
Belgian male sailors (sport)
Olympic sailors of Belgium
Olympic silver medalists for Belgium
Olympic medalists in sailing
Sailors at the 1920 Summer Olympics – 6 Metre
Sailors at the 1924 Summer Olympics – 6 Metre
Medalists at the 1920 Summer Olympics
Place of birth missing